Dordaneh (also Romanized as Dordāneh; also known as Dūrdāneh) is a village in Ahmadabad Rural District, Hasanabad District, Eqlid County, Fars Province, Iran. At the 2006 census, its population was 404, in 77 families.

References 

Populated places in Eqlid County